The Women's Rights Law Reporter is a journal of legal scholarship published by an independent student group at Rutgers School of Law—Newark. The journal was founded in 1970 by Rutgers law students working with Ruth Bader Ginsburg and Professor Nadine H. Taub. It was the first law journal in the U.S. to focus exclusively on women's rights. Professor Taub (now deceased) 
remained the faculty advisor of the journal through the 1980s and 1990s. The journal provides a forum for exploring law and public policy relating to women’s rights and gender.  The journal is published quarterly.

History and focus 
Ann Marie Boylan, a recent graduate of Rutgers School of Law, had been trying to establish a feminist journal. Boylan had created one issue of the Women's Rights Law Reporter (WRLR), published out of her apartment in Newark in 1970. She shared the idea for the journal with a women's group in Newark who wanted to help the publication become successful and it was suggested that they turn to Rutgers Law School. The women in the group met with the dean, James Paul, who said they would need to find a faculty advisor, find office space in the school and raise their own funds. Ruth Bader Ginsburg agreed to become the faculty advisor and space for WRLR was found in an old building. WRLR was moved onto Rutgers' campus in 1972 and became formally associated with Rutgers in 1974. Professor Nadine H. Taub was its faculty advisor for many years.

On its founding advisory board were Arthur Kinoy, Pauli Murray, Eleanor Holmes Norton, Ruth Bader Ginsburg, Margot Champagne, Mary Eastwood, Riane Eisler, Ann Freedman, Jo Ann Evans Gardner, Janice Goodman, Renee Hanover, Bernice Handler, Diane B. Schulder, Faith Seidenberg, and Nancy Stearns.

References

External links 
 Official site

American law journals
Rutgers Law School
Publications established in 1970
Women's rights in the United States
Law journals edited by students
English-language journals
Law and public policy journals